The following highways are numbered 550:

Canada
 Alberta Highway 550
 New Brunswick Route 550
 Ontario Highway 550
 Ontario Highway 550A
 Ontario Highway 550B
 Quebec Autoroute 550 (unbuilt)

Turkey 
 D.550

United States